is a former Japanese football player.

Playing career
Asano was born in Kyoto Prefecture on May 19, 1973. After graduating from high school, he joined Gamba Osaka in 1992. Although he debuted in 1993, he did not play in many matches and retired at the end of the 1995 season.

Club statistics

References

External links

1973 births
Living people
Association football people from Kyoto Prefecture
Japanese footballers
J1 League players
Gamba Osaka players
Association football defenders